Whites Valley is a semi-rural suburb of Adelaide, South Australia. It is home to many vineyards.

The 2016 Australian census which was conducted in August 2016 reports that Whites Valley had 295 people living within its boundaries.

Whites Valley is located in the federal division of Mayo, the state electoral district of Mawson and the local government area of the City of Onkaparinga.

References

Suburbs of Adelaide